Bryan Wency Forneste Chong (born August 12, 1999), better known as Bryan Chong, is a Filipino singer and songwriter from Quezon City, Philippines. He is dubbed as "The Prince of Soul".

Early life
Chong was born in Quezon City, raised in Angeles City, Pampanga and is now currently living in Lucena City, Quezon. His mother Merilyn Forneste is a former singer in South Korea.

Career
In 2017, Chong started his career by joining the first season of The Voice Teens, where he sang the South Border song "Kahit Kailan" during the blind auditions where he chose Sarah Geronimo to be his coach. He won the battle round with the song "Heaven Knows" by Rick Price but he was eliminated at the knockout round with the song "Mercy" by Shawn Mendes.

In 2018, he continued his career by joining the first season of The Clash, where he sang the Rihanna song "Love on the Brain" on the first round and made it at the Top 62 but got eliminated on the second round with the song "Magda" by Gloc-9.

In the same year, he and the rest of the alumni of '"The Clash" sang the 2018 GMA Christmas Station ID theme song "Puso Ng Pasko". 

In 2022, he auditioned at the second season of Idol Philippines with the song "Bukas Na Lang Kita Mamahalin" by Lani Misalucha where he got 4 yeses from the judges. He made it at the Top 5 at the grand finals.

Personal life
Chong has a foreign stepfather named Jake Long and has two half-siblings from him. He also has a younger brother named Byron Ace.

Accolades

Music

References

1999 births
Living people
Filipino singer-songwriters
People from Quezon City
People from Angeles City
Participants in Philippine reality television series
GMA Network personalities
GMA Music artists
ABS-CBN personalities
Star Music artists